François Rebsamen (born 25 June 1951) is a French politician who was the Minister of Social Affairs from 2014 to 2015. He is a member of the Socialist Party.

Early life and education
Rebsamen is the son of Eric Gottfried Rebsamen, a Protestant who was born in Stuttgart on 9 January 1917, and worked at Renault in Dijon for several months in 1939–40. In that same city, after the war, the senior Rebsamen married Denise Agron, daughter of Édouard Agron, a surgeon and radical socialist, originally from Briennon in the Loire, who was a member of Dijon's municipal council under the Popular Front. The senior Rebsamen died in Dijon on 19 February 1974.

François Rebsamen earned a master's degree in public law, a DESS in economics and a degree in political science.

In the early 1970s, he was an active member of the Ligue communiste révolutionnaire, a militant group. He left in 1974.

Political career 
François Rebsamen began his professional and political career by serving as chief of staff for the Regional Council of Burgundy from 1979 to 1983, where he worked alongside Pierre Joxe (1979-1982) and André Billardon (1982-1983). He followed Pierre Joxe to various other posts, serving as his chief of staff from 1984 to 1986 and again from 1988 to 1991. In 1989, he was elected president of the socialist caucus in the Dijon city council.

He then worked under Laurent Fabius while the latter was First Secretary of the Socialist Party (1992-1993), then as technical advisor to Jean-Jack Queyranne. In 1994, he was elected to the Regional Council of Burgundy. In 1997 he ran in the legislative elections in the first district of Côte-d'Or, but was defeated by Robert Poujade, the mayor of Dijon. In the same year, he was named National Secretary of the Socialist Party at the Brest Congress, and became the party's deputy head, under his friend François Hollande.

He was elected in March 1998 as the general councilor of the canton of Dijon-5, winning 51.5% of the votes and defeating the incumbent, Pierre Barbier (RPR). In 2001 he became the first leftist to be elected mayor of Dijon since 1935, winning 52.14% of the vote and defeating Jean-François Bazin (RPR). He ran again for the legislature in 2002, but lost to Bernard Depierre (UMP), who succeeded Poujade. He was re-elected general councilor in March 2004, this time winning 62.5% of the votes.

He directed the socialist campaign for the March 2004 regional and cantonal elections, and in 2005 ran the campaign for a "yes" vote in the referendum on the European institutional treaty. In June, then in August 2006, he asked Jack Lang and Dominique Strauss-Kahn to withdraw their candidacy for president of France, and explicitly supported Ségolène Royal, becoming co-director of her campaign, along with Jean-Louis Bianco.

He was re-elected mayor of Dijon on 9 March 2008, winning 56.22% of the votes to François-Xavier Dugourd's 36.44%. His plan to build a tramway in Dijon was unanimously approved by the Greater Dijon Community Council on 15 May 2008.

In 2007–8, he was a director of Dexia-Crédit Local de France, resigning a few days before it went bankrupt.

On 21 September 2008, he became a Senator, the first Socialist to represent Côte-d'Or in the Senate since 1948, and resigned then from the post of general counselor. In the Senate, he is a member of the National Committee on Finance, Budget Control, and Economic Accounts. After the Senatorial elections of 25 September 2011, and the election of 1 October, Rebsamen was chosen to lead the Socialist caucus in the Senate. In 2012, Rebsamen opposed a government effort tried to prevent politicians from holding multiple posts, and said that if forced to choose between continuing as Senator or as Mayor of Dijon he would opt for the latter.

On 30 March 2014, he was elected to his third term as Mayor with 52.84% of the votes, defeating Alain Houpert (UMP). On 2 April 2014, he was appointed Minister of Labor, Employment and Social Dialogue in the government of Manuel Valls. This appointment led Rebsamen to resign from the post of Mayor of Dijon. While at the Ministry of Labor, he was nicknamed "Minister of Unemployment" owing to the high jobless rate.

On 30 July 2015, after the death of Alain Millot, who had succeeded him as Mayor of Dijon, Rebsamen announced that he would run for that post again. On 10 August 2015, he was re-elected Mayor of Dijon, and a few days later he resigned his ministerial post. On 6 December 2016, he was offered the post of Minister of the Interior, which he refused because he preferred to remain Mayor of Dijon.

After being diagnosed with cancer, he announced, on 10 April 2018, that he would not be able to serve as Mayor of Dijon and President of the Dijon Metropolis during his treatment, and thus appointed Nathalie Koenders as interim president and Pierre Pribetich as interim president of the metropolis.

References

  Official website
Page on the Senate website

1951 births
Living people
Mayors of Dijon
French Senators of the Fifth Republic
Socialist Party (France) politicians
Government ministers of France
Senators of Côte-d'Or